Yaransky (masculine), Yaranskaya (feminine), or Yaranskoye (neuter) may refer to:
Yaransky District, a district of Kirov Oblast, Russia
Yaranskoye Urban Settlement, a municipal formation which the Town of Yaransk in Yaransky District of Kirov Oblast, Russia is incorporated as